Emily Carr (or M. Emily Carr as she sometimes signed her work) (December 13, 1871 – March 2, 1945) was a Canadian artist and writer who was inspired by the Indigenous peoples of the Pacific Northwest Coast. One of the painters in Canada to adopt a Modernist and Post-Impressionist style, Carr did not receive widespread recognition for her work, The Indian Church is now her best known, until she changed her subject matter from Aboriginal themes to landscapes — forest scenes in particular, evoking primeval grandeur.  As a writer Carr was one of the earliest chroniclers of life in British Columbia. The Canadian Encyclopedia describes her as a Canadian icon.

Early life 

Born in Victoria, British Columbia, in 1871, the year British Columbia joined Canada, Emily Carr was the second-youngest of nine children born to English parents Richard and Emily (Saunders) Carr. The Carr home was on Birdcage Walk (now Government Street), in the James Bay district of Victoria, a short distance from the legislative buildings (nicknamed the 'Birdcages') and the town itself.

The Carr children were raised on English tradition. Her father believed it was sensible to live on Vancouver Island, a colony of Great Britain, where he could practice English customs and continue his British citizenship. The family home was made up in lavish English fashion, with high ceilings, ornate moldings, and a parlor. Carr was taught in the Presbyterian tradition, with Sunday morning prayers and evening Bible readings. Her father called on one child per week to recite the sermon, and Emily consistently had trouble reciting it.

Carr's mother died in 1886, and her father died in 1888. Her oldest sister Edith Carr became the guardian of the rest of the children.

Carr's father encouraged her artistic inclinations, but it was only in 1890, after her parents' deaths, that Carr pursued her art seriously. She studied at the San Francisco Art Institute for two years (1890–92) before returning to Victoria. In 1899 Carr traveled to London, where she studied at the Westminster School of Art. Carr also visited the Nootka Indian mission at Ucluelet on the west coast of Vancouver Island in 1898. She traveled also to a rural art colony in St Ives, Cornwall, returning to British Columbia in 1905. Carr took a teaching position in Vancouver at the 'Ladies Art Club' that she held for no longer than a month – she was unpopular amongst her students due to her rude behavior of smoking and cursing at them in class, and the students began to boycott her courses.

First works on Indigenous people 

In 1898, at age 27, Carr made the first of several sketching and painting trips to Aboriginal villages. She stayed in a village near Ucluelet on the west coast of Vancouver Island, home to the Nuu-chah-nulth people, then commonly known to English-speaking people as 'Nootka'. Carr recalled that her time in Ucluelet made "a lasting impression on me". Her interest in Indigenous life was reinforced by a trip to Alaska nine years later with her sister Alice. In 1912, Carr took a sketching trip to First Nations' villages in Haida Gwaii, the Upper Skeena River, and Alert Bay.  Even though Carr left the villages of the Pacific Northwest, the impact of the people stayed with her.  Carr adopted the Indigenous name Klee Wyck and she also chose it as the title of one of her works of writings.

In 1913, Carr held a large exhibition of her work of First Nations villages and poles in their original setting. Her "Lecture on Totems" at Dominion Hall in Vancouver is in the Emily Carr Papers at the BC Archives in Victoria. In the lecture, she said "every pole shown in my collection has been studied from its own actual reality..."

Work in France 
Determined to further her knowledge of the age's evolving artistic trends, in 1910 Carr returned to Europe to study at the Académie Colarossi in Paris. In Montparnasse with her sister Alice, Emily Carr met modernist painter Harry Gibb with a letter of introduction. Upon viewing his work, she and her sister were shocked and intrigued by his use of distortion and vibrant colour; she wrote: "Mr Gibb's landscapes and still life delighted me — brilliant, luscious, clean. Against the distortion of his nudes I felt revolt." Carr's study with Gibb and his techniques shaped and influenced her style of painting, and she adopted a vibrant colour palette rather than continuing with the pastel colours of her earlier British training.
 Carr was greatly influenced by the Post-Impressionists and the Fauvists she met and studied with in France. After returning home in 1912, she organized an exhibition in her studio of seventy watercolours and oils representative of her time there. She was the first artist to introduce Fauvism to Vancouver.

Return to Canada 

In March 1912 Carr opened a studio at 1465 West Broadway in Vancouver. When locals failed to support her radical new style, bold colour palette and lack of detail, she closed the studio and returned to Victoria.
In the summer of 1912, Carr again traveled north, to Haida Gwaii and the Skeena River, where she documented the art of the Haida, Gitxsan and Tsimshian.  At Cumshewa, a Haida village on Moresby Island, she wrote:

Carr painted a carved raven, which she later developed as her iconic painting Big Raven. Tanoo, another painting inspired by work gathered on this trip, depicts three totems before house fronts at the village of the same name.  On her return to the south, Carr organized an exhibit of some of this work. She gave a detailed lecture about the Aboriginal villages that she had visited, which ended with her mission statement:

While there was some positive reaction to her work, even in the new 'French' style, Carr perceived that Vancouver's reaction to her work and new style was not positive enough to support her career. She recounted as much in her book Growing Pains. She was determined to give up teaching and working in Vancouver, and in 1913 she returned to Victoria, where several of her sisters still lived.

During the next 15 years, Carr did little painting. She ran a boarding house known as the 'House of All Sorts'. It was the namesake and provided source material for her later book. With her financial circumstances straitened and her life in Victoria circumscribed, Carr painted a few works in this period drawn from local scenes: the cliffs at Dallas Road, the trees in Beacon Hill Park.  Her own assessment of the period was that she had ceased to paint, which was not strictly true, although "[a]rt had ceased to be the primary drive of her life."

Growing recognition 
Over time Carr's work came to the attention of several influential and supportive people, including Marius Barbeau, a prominent ethnologist at the National Museum in Ottawa.  Barbeau in turn persuaded Eric Brown, Director of Canada's National Gallery, to visit Carr in 1927. Brown invited Carr to exhibit her work at the National Gallery as part of an exhibition on West Coast Aboriginal art.  Carr sent 26 oil paintings east, along with samples of her pottery and rugs with Indigenous designs.  The exhibit, which also included works by Edwin Holgate and A.Y. Jackson, traveled to Toronto and Montreal.

Carr continued to travel throughout the late 1920s and 1930s away from Victoria.  Her last trip north was in the summer of 1928, when she visited the Nass and Skeena rivers, as well as Haida Gwaii, formerly known as the Queen Charlotte Islands.  She also travelled to Friendly Cove and the northeast coast of Vancouver Island, and then to Lillooet in 1933.  Recognition of her work grew steadily, and her work was exhibited in London, Paris, Washington, DC, and Amsterdam, as well as major Canadian cities. Carr held her first solo show in eastern Canada in 1935 at the Women's Art Association of Canada gallery in Toronto.

Association with the Group of Seven 

It was at the exhibition on West Coast Aboriginal art at the National Gallery in 1927 that Carr first met members of the Group of Seven, at that time Canada's most recognized modern painters. Lawren Harris of the Group became a particularly important support: "You are one of us," he told Carr, welcoming her into the ranks of Canada's leading modernists. The encounter ended the artistic isolation of Carr's previous 15 years, leading to one of her most prolific periods, and the creation of many of her most notable works. Through her extensive correspondence with Harris, Carr also became aware of and studied Northern European symbolism.

Carr's artistic direction was influenced by the Group, and by Lawren Harris in particular, not only by his work, but also by his belief in Theosophy. Carr struggled to reconcile this with her own conception of God. Carr's "distrust for institutional religion" pervades much of her art. She became influenced by Theosophic thought, like many artists of the time, and began to form a new vision of God as nature. She led a spiritual way of life, rejecting the Church and the religious institution. She painted raw landscapes found in the Canadian wilderness, mystically animated by a greater spirit.

Influence of the Pacific Northwest school 
In 1924 and 1925, Carr exhibited at the Artists of the Pacific Northwest shows in Seattle, Washington.  Fellow exhibitor Mark Tobey came to visit her in Victoria in the autumn of 1928 to teach an advanced course in her studio. Working with Tobey, Carr furthered her understanding of modern art, experimenting with Tobey's methods of full-on abstraction and Cubism, but she was reluctant to follow Tobey beyond the legacy of Cubism. 

Although Carr expressed reluctance about abstraction, the Vancouver Art Gallery, a major curator of Carr's work, records Carr in this period as abandoning the documentary impulse and starting to concentrate instead on capturing the emotional and mythological content embedded in the totemic carvings. She jettisoned her painterly and practiced Post-Impressionist style in favour of creating highly stylized and abstracted geometric forms.

Focus shift and late life 

Carr suffered a heart attack in 1937, and another in 1939, forcing her to move in with her sister Alice to recover. In 1940 Carr suffered a serious stroke, and in 1942 she had another heart attack. With her ability to travel curtailed, Carr's focus shifted from her painting to her writing. The editorial assistance of Carr's friend Ira Dilworth, a professor of English, enabled Carr to see her own first book, Klee Wyck, published in 1941. Carr was awarded the Governor-General's Award for non-fiction the same year for the work.

Paintings from Carr's last decade reveal her growing anxiety about the environmental impact of industry on British Columbia's landscape. Her work from this time reflected her growing concern over industrial logging, its ecological effects and its encroachment on the lives of Indigenous people. In her painting Odds and Ends, from 1939 "the cleared land and tree stumps shift the focus from the majestic forestscapes that lured European and American tourists to the West Coast to reveal instead the impact of deforestation."

Emily Carr suffered her last heart attack and died on March 2, 1945, at the James Bay Inn in her hometown of Victoria, British Columbia, shortly before she was to have been awarded an honorary doctorate by the University of British Columbia.  Carr is buried at Ross Bay Cemetery.

Work

Painting 

Carr is remembered primarily for her painting.  She was one of the first artists to attempt to capture the spirit of Canada in a modern style.  Carr's main themes in her mature work were natives and nature: "native totem poles set in deep forest locations or sites of abandoned native villages" and, later, "the large rhythms of Western forests, driftwood-tossed beaches and expansive skies". She blended these two themes in ways uniquely her own. Her "qualities of painterly skill and vision [...] enabled her to give form to a Pacific mythos that was so carefully distilled in her imagination".

At the California School of Design in San Francisco, Carr participated in art classes which were focused on a variety of artistic styles.  Many of Carr's art professors were trained in the Beaux Arts tradition in Paris, France.  Though she took classes in drawing, portraiture, still life, landscape painting, and flower painting, Carr preferred to paint landscapes.

Carr is known for her paintings of First Nations villages and Pacific Northwest Indian totems, but Maria Tippett explains that Carr's rare depictions of the forests of British Columbia from within make her work unique.  Carr constructed a new understanding of Cascadia.  This understanding includes a new approach to the presentation of native people and Canadian landscapes.

After visiting the Gitksan village of Kitwancool in the summer of 1928, Carr became captivated by the maternal imagery in Pacific Northwest Indigenous totem poles.  After Carr was exposed to these types of images, her paintings reflected these images of mother and child in Native carvings.

Her painting can be divided into several distinct phases:  her early work, before her studies in Paris; her early paintings under the Fauvist influence of her time in Paris; a post-impressionist middle period before her encounter with the Group of Seven; and her later, formal period, under the post-cubist influences of Lawren Harris and American artist and friend, Mark Tobey.  Carr used charcoal and watercolour for her sketches, and later, house paint thinned with gasoline on manila paper. The greatest part of her mature work was oil on canvas or, when money was scarce, oil on paper.

On November 28, 2013, one of Carr's paintings, The Crazy Stair (The Crooked Staircase), sold for $3.39 million at Heffel’s live auction in Toronto. As of the sale, it is a record price for a painting by a Canadian female artist.

Carr's painting Old Time Coast Village (1929–30) is referenced in Korean Canadian artist Jin-me Yoon's A Group of Sixty-Seven (1996). The work is composed of sixty-seven portraits of the Korean Canadian community in Vancouver standing in front of Old Time Coast Village and a landscape painting by Group of Seven member Lawren S. Harris.

Writing 
Carr is also remembered for her writing, largely about her native friends. In addition to Klee Wyck, Carr wrote The Book of Small (1942), The House of All Sorts (1944), and, published posthumously, Growing Pains (1946), Pause (1953), The Heart of a Peacock (1953), and Hundreds and Thousands (1966). Some of these books are autobiographical and reveal Carr as an accomplished writer. Criticisms have been made of her dramatized short stories as many readers expect them to be historically accurate.

Recognition 

Carr's life itself made her a "Canadian icon", according to the Canadian Encyclopedia. As well as being "an artist of stunning originality and strength", she was an exceptionally late bloomer, starting the work for which she is best known at the age of 57 (see Grandma Moses). Carr was also an artist who succeeded against the odds, living in an artistically unadventurous society, and working mostly in seclusion away from major art centres, thus making her "a darling of the women's movement" (see Georgia O'Keeffe, whom she met in 1930 in New York City).  Emily Carr brought the north to the south; the west to the east; glimpses of the ancient culture of the Indigenous peoples of the Americas to the most newly arrived Europeans on the continent. However, it should be recognized that art historians who write about Carr in depth often respond to their particular points of view: Feminist studies (Sharyn R. Udall, 2000), First Nations scholarship (Gerta Moray, 2006), or the critical study of what an artist says as a tool to analyze the work itself (Charles C. Hill, Ian Thom, 2006).

In 1952, works by Emily Carr along with those of David Milne, Goodridge Roberts and Alfred Pellan represented Canada at the Venice Biennale.

On February 12, 1971, Canada Post issued a 6¢ stamp 'Emily Carr, painter, 1871–1945' designed by William Rueter based on Carr's Big Raven (1931), held by the Vancouver Art Gallery. On May 7, 1991, Canada Post issued a 50¢ stamp 'Forest, British Columbia, Emily Carr, 1931–1932' designed by Pierre-Yves Pelletier based on Forest, British Columbia (1931–1932), also from the Vancouver Art Gallery collection.

In 1978, she was awarded the Royal Canadian Academy of Arts Medal. In 2014–2015, the Dulwich Picture Gallery in south London hosted a solo exhibition, the first time such show was held in Britain. In 2020, a travelling exhibition organized by the Audain Art Museum in Whistler, B.C. and co-curated by Kiriko Watanabe and Dr. Kathryn Bridge and titled Emily Carr: Fresh Seeing – French Modernism and the West Coast explored this aspect of Carr`s work in detail.

Carr has been designated as an Historic Person in the Directory of Federal Heritage Designations.
Minor planet 5688 Kleewyck is named after her.

Record sale prices
At the Cowley Abbott auction in Toronto, December 1, 2022, Carr's The Totem of the Bear and the Moon (1912), oil on canvas, 37 x 17.75 ins (94 x 45.1 cms), Auction Estimate: $2,000,000.00 - $3,000,000.00, sold for $3,120,000.00.

Institutions named for Carr 

 Emily Carr House in Victoria, British Columbia
 Emily Carr University of Art and Design in Vancouver, British Columbia
 Emily Carr Public Library in Victoria, British Columbia
 Emily Carr Secondary School in Woodbridge, Ontario
 Emily Carr Elementary School in Vancouver, British Columbia
 Emily Carr Middle School in Ottawa, Ontario
 Emily Carr public schools in London, Toronto, and Oakville, Ontario
 In 1994, the Working Group for Planetary System Nomenclature of the International Astronomical Union adopted the name Carr for a crater on Venus. The Carr crater has an approximate diameter of 31.9 kilometers.
 Emily Carr Inlet, an arm of Chapple Inlet on the North Coast of British Columbia

Biographies 
A complete illustrated artist's biography of Emily Carr emphasising both her life and the development of her art is Emily Carr: A biography by Maria Tippett, Oxford University Press, 1979. Tippett's biography won the Governor General's Award for English-language non-fiction in 1979.

Several biographies have been published of Carr's life with unsubstantiated speculations. Novelist Susan Vreeland's 2004 The Forest Lover brings in characters that did not exist in Carr's life, as well as factually recounting incidents that may not have happened. The book is a novelisation, not biography, based on events from Carr's life, using Emily Carr as the main character/protagonist and altering some characters and chronology for the purpose of pacing. Each part of the novel is introduced by a reproduction of a Carr painting.

Archives 
The British Columbia Archives holds the largest collection of Emily Carr artworks, sketches, and archival materials, which includes the Emily Carr fonds, the Emily Carr Art Collection, and a wealth of archival documents in held in the fonds of Carr's friends. There is an Emily Carr fonds at Library and Archives Canada. The archival reference number is R1969, former archival reference number MG30-D215. The fonds covers the date range 1891 to 1991. It consists of 1.764 meters of textual records, 10 photographs, 1 print, 7 drawings. A number of the records have been digitized and are available online. Library and Archives Canada also holds a number of other fonds containing material that touch on Emily Carr and her artistic works.

See also 
 Modern art

References

Sources 

 
 
 
 
 
 .
 
 
 
 
 
 
 
 .

Further reading 

 
 
 
 
 
 
 
 
 
 
 
 .
 
 Orford, Emily-Jane Hills. (2008). "The Creative Spirit: Stories of 20th Century Artists". Ottawa: Baico Publishing. 
 
 Reid, Dennis. (1988). A Concise History of Canadian Painting 2nd Edition. Toronto: Oxford University Press.

External links 

 
 Emily Carr House
 Detailed Biography of Emily Carr
 The full text of some of Emily Carr's books is available from Project Gutenberg of Australia.
 A virtual exhibit on the life of Emily Carr
 National Film Board of Canada short film for kids on Emily Carr
 Gallery of Carr's paintings
 Emily Carr, The Canadian Encyclopedia

Emily Carr
1871 births
1945 deaths
20th-century Canadian women artists
Académie Colarossi alumni
Alumni of the Westminster School of Art
Artists from Victoria, British Columbia
Canadian Impressionist painters
Canadian landscape painters
Canadian memoirists
Canadian women painters
Expressionist painters
Governor General's Award-winning non-fiction writers
Group of Seven (artists)
Modern painters
Pacific Northwest artists
Persons of National Historic Significance (Canada)
Post-impressionist painters
San Francisco Art Institute alumni
Canadian women memoirists
Writers from Victoria, British Columbia